Big is the fourth studio album by American singer and songwriter Macy Gray. It was released on March 21, 2007, by Geffen Records. It is Gray's first studio album in four years. The album debuted at number 39 on the US Billboard 200, selling 23,000 copies in its first week.

Three singles were released from the album: "Finally Made Me Happy" (a collaboration with Natalie Cole), "Shoo Be Doo", and "What I Gotta Do". The latter was included on the Shrek the Third soundtrack. Music from this album was also featured in the I Love New York season one reunion. The album's cover art was widely illustrated on iPhone ads and featured on the first boxes of the iPod Touch.

Critical reception

Big received mixed reviews from music critics. At Metacritic, which assigns a normalized rating out of 100 to reviews from mainstream critics, the album received an average score of 62, based on 17 reviews.

Dan Gennoe of Yahoo! Music called Gray's Big "the worthy follow-up to her On How Life Is debut," praising the contributions from the guest artists and the restraint of her signature musical persona. He added that the lack of radio hits on the record may prevent Gray's career from rebounding, but said that "Whatever the commercial outcome though, no one can say that this is anything other than a supreme return to form." John Bush of AllMusic noted how the quiet storm production from will.i.am made Big "the slickest album of Gray's career," but said that it brings into better focus the vocal quirks of her personality throughout the track listing, concluding that "It'll be interesting to see if past Macy Gray fans are willing to follow her into adult contemporary territory, while those who might like the new direction will be able to alter their perceptions of her." Jon Dolan, writing for Blender, said that Gray's "confessional blues-rasp" is better utilized on more mature tracks like the Fergie collaboration "Glad You're Here", saying that "It’s ’licious, but in a classy way."

Rob Brunner of Entertainment Weekly highlighted "Shoo Be Doo", "What I Gotta Do" and "Okay" as great showcases for Gray's "fascinating cracks and warbles" but said that, "Much of Big is either boring or forced, as when Gray launches into ”You Spin Me Round (Like a Record)” for no discernible reason." Slant Magazine's Sal Cinquemani felt that Gray's vocals were lacking compared to the featured artists surrounding the album, saying that "she struggles to reach and sustain notes that should be comfortably within her range." Mike Joseph of PopMatters gave feint praise by calling it "a perfectly serviceable adult-soul album", saying that the upbeat tracks capture Macy's old personality better than the ballads. He added that, "While Big shows flashes of the irrepressible spirit that made Macy's first two albums fun to listen to, there are many more instances of uninspired, boring music designed to capture a middle-of-the-road audience."

Track listing

Sample credits
 "Ghetto Love" contains a sample of "It's a Man's Man's Man's World" by James Brown.
 "One for Me" contains a sample of "Dream" by Frank Sinatra.
 "Get Out" contains an interpolation of "Get Out of My Life, Woman" written by Allen Toussaint.
 "Treat Me Like Your Money" contains a sample of "You Spin Me Round (Like a Record)" by Dead or Alive and "It's Like That" by Run–D.M.C.

Personnel
Credits adapted from the liner notes of Big.

 Macy Gray – vocals ; production ; backing vocals ; executive production
 Jay Anderson – backing vocals 
 Davis Barnett – viola 
 Dawn Beckman – backing vocals 
 Giuliano Bekor – photography
 Printz Board – trumpet ; keyboards ; Rhodes 
 Jeff Chestek – string recording 
 Natalie Cole – additional vocals 
 "Angry" Mike Eleopoulos – recording engineering 
 Scott Elgin – engineering assistance 
 Ron Fair – production, string arrangements, string conducting ; Pro Tools, recording engineering ; piano solo ; additional piano, Wurlitzer ; organ ; piano ; harmonica ; executive production
 Mike Farrell – keyboards 
 Fergie – additional vocals 
 Ghislaine Fleischmann – violin 
 Paloma Ford – backing vocals 
 Nick Fournier – engineering assistance 
 Brian "Big Bass" Gardner – mastering
 Larry Gold – string arrangements 
 Jared Gosselin – production ; programming 
 Gravillis Inc. – art direction, design
 Jeremy Gregory – backing vocals, vocal arrangement 
 Bernie Grundman – mastering
 Keith Harris – percussion ; drums ; Rhodes ; keyboards ; piano 
 Tal Herzberg – recording engineering ; Pro Tools 
 Victor Indrizzo – drums 
 Tim Izo – saxophone ; flute ; clarinet 
 Eric Jackson – guitar 
 Jaycen Joshua – mixing engineeringassistance 
 Gloria Justen – violin 
 Ryan Kennedy – mixing engineering assistance 
 Padraic Kerin – recording engineering 
 Sarah Killion – mixing engineering assistance 
 Emma Kummrow – violin 
 Mike Lett – backing vocals 
 Josh Lopez – guitar 
 Jennie Lorenzo – cello 
 Tony Maserati – mixing 
 Glen McIntyre – backing vocals 
 Justin Meldal-Johnsen – bass 
 Peter Mokran – mixing 
 Dean Nelson – mixing engineering assistance 
 Peter Nocella – viola 
 Noiztrip – production 
 Cassandra O'Neil – organ, piano ; keyboards 
 George Pajon Jr. – guitar 
 Dave "Hard Drive" Pensado – mixing 
 Jack Joseph Puig – mixing 
 Montez Roberts – engineering assistance 
 Dan Rockett – guitar 
 Jeremy Ruzumna – keyboards 
 Rafael Serrano – mixing engineering assistance 
 Mike Shapiro – percussion ; drums 
 Caleb Speir – bass 
 Justin Timberlake – drums ; backing vocals, keyboards, production ; guitar 
 Igor Szwec – violin 
 Doug Tyo – engineering assistance 
 Jason Villaroman – recording engineering ; programming 
 Dave Way – mixing 
 Eric Weaver – mixing engineeringassistance 
 Khalfani White – backing vocals 
 Phillip White – percussion ; backing vocals, production 
 will.i.am – production ; recording engineering ; programming ; keyboards ; executive production
 Ethan Willoughby – recording engineering 
 Frank Wolf – recording engineering

Charts

Release history

References

2007 albums
Albums produced by Justin Timberlake
Albums produced by Ron Fair
Albums produced by will.i.am
Geffen Records albums
Macy Gray albums